Edna Frances Tichenor (April 1, 1901 – November 19, 1965) was an American film actress whose career was most prominent in the silent film era of the 1920s, affecting an onscreen vamp persona. She is perhaps best recalled for three roles in director Tod Browning films: the 1923 drama Drifting, the silent horror film London After Midnight, and the drama The Show, both released in 1927.

Early life
Tichenor was born in Saint Paul, Minnesota, to Ira C. and Hattie Tichenor (née Craig). By 1904, the family relocated to Los Angeles, California, where her father worked as a real estate editor for the Los Angeles Examiner, then later as financial editor of the Salt Lake City Telegram in Utah, before returning to Los Angeles.

Tichenor attended primary and secondary schools in Los Angeles and was a graduate of Long Beach Polytechnic High School. Shortly after her graduation, she married auto mechanic Robert J. Springer in 1919. The couple divorced in 1930.

Career
Tichenor's first known credited role was as Molly Norton in the 1923 Tod Browning directed drama film Drifting, starring Priscilla Dean, Matt Moore and Anna May Wong. It was produced and distributed by Universal Pictures. The same year, she appeared in two more films; the small role of Dolly Baxter in the Harry Beaumont directed comedy The Gold Diggers (1923) for Warner Bros., and an uncredited role as Cleo in the romantic drama Maytime (1923), directed by Louis J. Gasnier and featuring Clara Bow in an early role.

By the mid-1920s, Tichenor began affecting a somewhat sinister vamp onscreen persona; appearing in roles such as The Painted Lady in the Chester M. Franklin crime-drama The Silent Accuser (1924), and two roles in 1926 film shorts simply billed as The Vamp. Tichenor is possibly best recalled for roles in two 1927 films by directed by Tod Browning; the small role of Arachnida, a carnival sideshow performer who has the body of a spider and a woman's head, in the crime-drama The Show; and as Luna, The Bat Girl in Browning's lost horror film London After Midnight, released by Metro-Goldwyn-Mayer and starring Lon Chaney. The last known copy of the film known to exist was destroyed in the 1965 MGM vault fire.

In all, Tichenor appeared in approximately twelve films before retiring from acting. Her last known film appearance was a small role in Tod Browing's 1928 mystery film West of Zanzibar, starring Lon Chaney and Lionel Barrymore.

Personal life and death
Following her divorce from Robert J. Springer in 1930, Tichenor moved back in with her parents in Los Angeles. She later married Harry West. Tichenor died in 1965 at Cedars-Sinai Medical Center from a perforation of her cecum and blood poisoning with an intestinal obstruction following surgery to remove her uterus and ovaries, aged 64. She was cremated and her ashes were given to West.

Filmography

References

External links

1901 births
1965 deaths
American film actresses
American silent film actresses
Actresses from Saint Paul, Minnesota
20th-century American actresses
Long Beach Polytechnic High School alumni